Oxford Handbook of Japanese Cinema is a 2010 non-fiction book published by Oxford University Press and edited by Daisuke Miyao.

References 

Books about films
2010 non-fiction books
Japanese Cinema
Books about Japan
Cinema of Japan